Blackheath Common is an area of  of heathland in Surrey, England, near the village of Albury in the borough of Waverley. It is part of the Surrey Hills Area of Outstanding Natural Beauty, and much of the common is a designated Site of Special Scientific Interest. It is frequented by many walkers and cyclists.

See also
Blackheath SSSI, Surrey
Blackheath village

References

Sites of Special Scientific Interest in Surrey